Maryland House of Delegates District 9A is one of the 67 districts that compose the Maryland House of Delegates. Along with subdistrict 9B, it makes up the 9th district of the Maryland Senate. District 9A includes parts of Carroll County and Howard County, and is represented by two delegates.

Demographic characteristics
As of the 2020 United States census, the district had a population of 97,589, of whom 74,024 (75.9%) were of voting age. The racial makeup of the district was 66,430 (68.1%) White, 5,989 (6.1%) African American, 169 (0.2%) Native American, 17,490 (17.9%) Asian, 28 (0.0%) Pacific Islander, 1,193 (1.2%) from some other race, and 6,304 (6.5%) from two or more races. Hispanic or Latino of any race were 3,821 (3.9%) of the population.

The district had 72,308 registered voters as of October 17, 2020, of whom 16,512 (22.8%) were registered as unaffiliated, 28,007 (38.7%) were registered as Republicans, 26,755 (37.0%) were registered as Democrats, and 631 (0.9%) were registered to other parties.

Past Election Results

1998

2002

2006

2010

2014

2018

References

9A